UFC Fight Night: Lineker vs. Dodson (also known as UFC Fight Night 96) was a mixed martial arts event produced by the Ultimate Fighting Championship that was held on October 1, 2016, at Moda Center in Portland, Oregon.

Background
The event was the second that the organization hosted in Portland, with the first being UFC 102 in August 2009.

The event was headlined by a bantamweight bout between John Lineker and former two-time UFC Flyweight Championship challenger and The Ultimate Fighter: Team Bisping vs. Team Miller bantamweight winner John Dodson.

On September 9, two fighters pulled out from their bouts: Brian Ortega and Bobby Green were expected to face Hacran Dias and Josh Burkman, respectively. Ortega was replaced by Andre Fili, while Green was replaced by promotional newcomer Zak Ottow. Due to the late replacement, Burkman-Ottow was contested at welterweight.

Sergio Pettis was expected to face Louis Smolka at the event. However, Pettis pulled out of the fight on September 22 citing what his trainer described as "a minor injury". Smolka remained on the card and faced promotional newcomer Brandon Moreno, from The Ultimate Fighter: Tournament of Champions.

At the weigh-ins, three fighters, John Lineker, Alex Oliveira and Hacran Dias each missed the required weight limit for their respective fights. As a result, all three fighters were fined 20% of their fight purse, which went to their opponents.

Results

Bonus awards
The following fighters were awarded $50,000 bonuses:
Fight of the Night: None awarded
Performance of the Night: Brandon Moreno, Luis Henrique da Silva, Nate Marquardt and Curtis Blaydes

Reported payout
The following is the reported payout to the fighters as reported to the Oregon State Athletic Commission. It does not include sponsor money or "locker room" bonuses often given by the UFC and also do not include the UFC's traditional "fight night" bonuses.

John Lineker: $72,000 (includes $40,000 win bonus) def. John Dodson: $38,000 ^
Alex Oliveira: $43,200 (includes $24,000 win bonus) def. Will Brooks: $57,800 ^ 
Zak Ottow: $24,000 (includes $12,000 win bonus) def. Josh Burkman: $54,000
Brandon Moreno: $20,000 (includes $10,000 win bonus) def. Louis Smolka: $32,000
Luis Henrique da Silva: $24,000 (includes $12,000 win bonus) def. Joachim Christensen: $10,000 
Andre Fili: $39,200 (includes $18,000 win bonus) def. Hacran Dias: $12,800 ^
Shamil Abdurakhimov: $28,000 (includes $14,000 win bonus) def. Walt Harris: $12,000
Elizeu Zaleski dos Santos: $24,000 (includes $12,000 win bonus) def. Keita Nakamura: $19,000  
Nate Marquardt: $112,000 (includes $56,000 win bonus) def. Tamdan McCrory: $15,000
Ion Cuțelaba: $20,000 (includes $10,000 win bonus) def. Jonathan Wilson: $12,000
Curtis Blaydes: $20,000 (includes $10,000 win bonus) def. Cody East: $10,000
Ketlen Vieira: $20,000 (includes $10,000 win bonus) def. Kelly Faszholz: $10,000

^ John Lineker, Alex Oliveira and Hacran Dias were fined 20 percent of their purse for failing to make the required weight limit for their respective fights. That money was issued to their opponents, an OSAC official confirmed.

See also
List of UFC events
2016 in UFC

References

UFC Fight Night
Events in Portland, Oregon
Mixed martial arts in Oregon
Sports in Portland, Oregon
2016 in mixed martial arts
October 2016 sports events in the United States